At the BBC is a live box set containing three CDs and a DVD by alternative rock band Siouxsie and the Banshees, released in June 2009 by record label Universal International. 

The physical version is sold out; the boxset is hence only available on audio streaming and media services such as Amazon Prime Music, iTunes, Spotify and Deezer.

Content 

At the BBC consists of four discs containing 84 digitally remastered tracks of BBC sessions, live concert tracks and TV performances recorded between 1977 and 1991 split across three CDs and a DVD, as well has a hard-back book.

The DVD featured several live sessions filmed for The Old Grey Whistle Test and Oxford Road Show, and for the first time, a previously-unreleased concert filmed in Warwick in March 1981, prior to their Juju album, with John McGeoch on guitar. Robert Smith was also featured on guitar on nine songs, including a TV session in 1979 and all the TV appearances from November 1982 through March 1984.

Reception 

Mojo wrote:

Track listing

Disc one
 "Love in a Void" (John Peel 29/11/77)
 "Mirage" (John Peel 29/11/77)
 "Metal Postcard" (John Peel 29/11/77)
 "Suburban Relapse" (John Peel 29/11/77)
 "Hong Kong Garden" (John Peel 6/2/78)
 "Overground" (John Peel 6/2/78)
 "Carcass" (John Peel 6/2/78)
 "Helter Skelter" (John Peel 6/2/78)
 "Placebo Effect" (John Peel 9/4/79)
 "Playground Twist" (John Peel 9/4/79)
 "Regal Zone" (John Peel 9/4/79)
 "Poppy Day" (John Peel 9/4/79)
 "Halloween" (John Peel 10/2/81)
 "Voodoo Dolly" (John Peel 10/2/81)
 "But Not Them" (John Peel 10/2/81)
 "Into The Light" (John Peel 10/2/81)
 "Arabian Knights" (Richard Skinner Show – Recorded 4.6.81. Transmitted 16.6.81)
 "Red Over White" (Richard Skinner Show – Recorded 4.6.81. Transmitted 16.6.81)
 "Headcut" (Richard Skinner Show – Recorded 4.6.81. Transmitted 16.6.81)
 "Supernatural Thing" (Richard Skinner Show – Recorded 4.6.81. Transmitted 16.6.81)

Disc two
 "Coal Mind" (Kid Jensen Show Recorded 13.5.82. Transmitted 24.5.82.)
 "Green Fingers" (Kid Jensen Show – Recorded 13.5.82. Transmitted 24.5.82.)
 "Painted Bird" (Kid Jensen Show – Recorded 13.5.82. Transmitted 24.5.82.)
 "Cascade" (Kid Jensen Show – Recorded 13.5.82. Transmitted 24.5.82.)
 "Candyman" (John Peel 10/2/86)
 "Cannons" (John Peel 10/2/86)
 "Land's End" (John Peel 10/2/86)
 "Shooting Sun" (Janice Long Show – Recorded 11.1.87. Transmitted 2.2.87.)
 "Song from the Edge Of The World" (Janice Long Show – Recorded 11.1.87. Transmitted 2.2.87.)
 "Little Johnny Jewel" (Janice Long Show – Recorded 11.1.87. Transmitted 2.2.87.)
 "Something Blue" (Janice Long Show – Recorded 11.1.87. Transmitted 2.2.87.)
 "Green Fingers" (Apollo Theatre, Oxford in Concert – Recorded 14.11.85. Transmitted 10.3.86.)
 "Bring Me the Head of the Preacher Man" (Apollo Theatre, Oxford in Concert – Recorded 14.11.85. Transmitted 10.3.86.)
 "Sweetest Chill" (Apollo Theatre, Oxford in Concert – Recorded 14.11.85. Transmitted 10.3.86.)
 "Cannons" (Apollo Theatre, Oxford in Concert – Recorded 14.11.85. Transmitted 10.3.86.)
 "Melt!" (Apollo Theatre, Oxford in Concert – Recorded 14.11.85. Transmitted 10.3.86.)
 "Candyman" (Apollo Theatre, Oxford in Concert – Recorded 14.11.85. Transmitted 10.3.86.)
 "Land's End" (Apollo Theatre, Oxford in Concert – Recorded 14.11.85. Transmitted 10.3.86.)

Disc three
 "Night Shift" (Apollo Theatre, Oxford in Concert – Recorded 14.11.85. Transmitted 10.3.86.)
 "92 Degrees" (Apollo Theatre, Oxford in Concert – Recorded 14.11.85. Transmitted 10.3.86.)
 "Pulled to Bits" (Apollo Theatre, Oxford in Concert – Recorded 14.11.85. Transmitted 10.3.86.)
 "Switch" (Apollo Theatre, Oxford in Concert – Recorded 14.11.85. Transmitted 10.3.86.)
 "Happy House" (Apollo Theatre, Oxford in Concert – Recorded 14.11.85. Transmitted 10.3.86.)
 "Cities in Dust" (Apollo Theatre, Oxford in Concert – Recorded 14.11.85. Transmitted 10.3.86.)
 "The Last Beat of My Heart" (Royal Albert Hall, London – Recorded 12.9.88. Transmitted 14.10.88.)
 "The Killing Jar" (Royal Albert Hall, London – Recorded 12.9.88. Transmitted 14.10.88.)
 "Christine" (Royal Albert Hall, London – Recorded 12.9.88. Transmitted 14.10.88.)
 "This Wheel's on Fire" (Royal Albert Hall, London – Recorded 12.9.88. Transmitted 14.10.88.)
 "Something Blue" (Royal Albert Hall, London – Recorded 12.9.88. Transmitted 14.10.88.)
 "Rawhead and Bloody Bones" (Royal Albert Hall, London – Recorded 12.9.88. Transmitted 14.10.88.)
 "Carousel" (Royal Albert Hall, London – Recorded 12.9.88. Transmitted 14.10.88.)
 "Rhapsody" (Royal Albert Hall, London – Recorded 12.9.88. Transmitted 14.10.88.)
 "Skin" (Royal Albert Hall, London – Recorded 12.9.88. Transmitted 14.10.88.)
 "Spellbound" (Royal Albert Hall, London – Recorded 12.9.88. Transmitted 14.10.88.)
 "Hong Kong Garden" (Royal Albert Hall, London – Recorded 12.9.88. Transmitted 14.10.88.)

DVD
 "Metal Postcard" (The Old Grey Whistle Test: 07/11/1978 Stereo)
 "Jigsaw Feeling" (The Old Grey Whistle Test: 07/11/1978 Stereo)
 "Playground Twist" (Top of the Pops: 12/07/1979 Stereo)
 "Love in a Void" (Something Else 03/11/1979 Stereo)
 "Regal Zone" (Something Else 03/11/1979 Stereo)
 "Happy House" (Top of the Pops Date: 10/04/1980 Stereo)
 "Israel" (Something Else: 15 December 1980 Stereo)
 "Tenant" (Something Else: 15 December 1980 Stereo)
 "Israel" (Rock Goes to College: 09/03/1981 Stereo)
 "Spellbound" (Rock Goes to College: 09/03/1981 Stereo)
 "Arabian Knights" (Rock Goes to College: 09/03/1981 Stereo)
 "Halloween" (Rock Goes to College: 09/03/1981 Stereo)
 "Night Shift" (Rock Goes to College: 09/03/1981 Stereo)
 "But Not Them" (Rock Goes to College: 09/03/1981 Stereo)
 "Voodoo Dolly" (Rock Goes to College: 09/03/1981 Stereo)
 "Eve White/Eve Black" (Rock Goes to College: 09/03/1981 Stereo)
 "Spellbound" (Top of the Pops 04/06/1981 Stereo)
 "Fireworks" (Top of the Pops Date: 03/06/1982 Stereo)
 "Melt!" (The Old Grey Whistle Test 12/11/1982)
 "Painted Bird" (The Old Grey Whistle Test 12/11/1982)
 "Melt!" (Oxford Road Show 03/12/1982 Stereo)
 "Overground" (Oxford Road Show 03/12/1982 Stereo)
 "Dear Prudence" (Top of the Pops 29 September 1983 Stereo)
 "Dear Prudence" (Top of the pops 29/12/83 Stereo)
 "Swimming Horses" (Top of the Pops 29 March 1984 Stereo)
 "Cities in Dust" (Whistle Test Date: 29 October 1985 Stereo)
 "Lands End" (Whistle Test Date: 29 October 1985 Stereo)
 "This Wheel's on Fire" (Top of the Pops 22 January 1987 Stereo)
 "Peek-a-Boo" (Top of the Pops 28 July 1988 Stereo)
 "Kiss Them for Me" (Top of the Pops 30 May 1991 Stereo)

References 

BBC Radio recordings
2009 live albums
2009 compilation albums
Siouxsie and the Banshees compilation albums